Moore County is a county located in the U.S. state of Texas. As of the 2020 census, its population was 21,358. The county seat is Dumas. The county was created in 1876 and organized in 1892. It is named for Edwin Ward Moore, the commander of the Texas Navy. The Dumas micropolitan statistical area includes all of Moore County.

Moore County history is highlighted in the Window on the Plains Museum in Dumas.

Geography

Major highways
  U.S. Highway 87
  U.S. Highway 287
  State Highway 152
  State Highway 354

Adjacent counties
 Sherman County (north)
 Hutchinson County (east)
 Carson County (southeast)
 Potter County (south)
 Oldham County (southwest)
 Hartley County (west)
 Dallam County (northwest)

National protected area
 Lake Meredith National Recreation Area (part)

Demographics

2020 census

Note: the US Census treats Hispanic/Latino as an ethnic category. This table excludes Latinos from the racial categories and assigns them to a separate category. Hispanics/Latinos can be of any race.

2000 Census
At the 2000 census, 20,121 people, 6,774 households, and 5,331 families were in the county.  The population density was 22 people/sq mi (9/km2).  There were 7,478 housing units at an average density of 8 per square mile (3/km2).  The racial makeup of the county was 63.93% White, 0.69% Black or African American, 0.67% Native American, 0.86% Asian, 0.03% Pacific Islander, 31.20% from other races, and 2.62% from two or more races. 47.50% of the population were Hispanic or Latino of any race.
Of the 6,774 households 44.80% had children under the age of 18 living with them, 65.10% were married couples living together, 9.00% had a female householder with no husband present, and 21.30% were non-families. 18.20% of households were one person and 8.30% were one person aged 65 or older.  The average household size was 2.94 and the average family size was 3.36.

The age distribution was 33.60% under 18, 9.20% from 18 to 24, 28.40% from 25 to 44, 18.30% from 45 to 64, and 10.60% 65 or older.  The median age was 30 years. For every 100 females, there were 100.60 males.  For every 100 females age 18 and over, there were 97.40 males.

The median household income was $34,852 and the median family income  was $37,985. Males had a median income of $29,843 versus $19,383 for females. The per capita income for the county was $15,214.  About 10.10% of families and 13.50% of the population were below the poverty line, including 18.10% of those under age 18 and 10.90% of those age 65 or over.

Politics
Moore County is a strongly Republican county, having given Senator John McCain 78.76% of the vote, over only 20.65% for Barack Obama in 2008. It also gave George W Bush (R) 81.75% over 17.93% John Kerry (D) in 2004.

Moore County is represented in the Texas House of Representatives by the Republican Walter Price, IV, elected on November 2, 2010. The district also includes the majority of neighboring Potter County — Amarillo. Moore county is represented in the US house of representatives by Mac Thornberry (R) as it is a part of Texas's 13th congressional district.

Communities

Cities
 Cactus
 Dumas (county seat)
 Fritch (mostly in Hutchinson County)
 Sunray

Unincorporated community
 Masterson

Education
School districts:
 Dumas Independent School District
 Sanford-Fritch Independent School District
 Sunray Independent School District

All of the county is in the service area of Amarillo College.

See also

 List of museums in the Texas Panhandle
 Recorded Texas Historic Landmarks in Moore County
 Impact of the 2019–20 coronavirus pandemic on the meat industry in the United States

References

External links
 
 Moore County Profile from the Texas Association of Counties

 
1892 establishments in Texas
Populated places established in 1892
Texas Panhandle
Majority-minority counties in Texas